The F.O.J. Smith Tomb is an historic tomb in Evergreen Cemetery in Portland, Maine.  It is the tomb of Francis Ormand Jonathan Smith (1806–76), US Congressman 1833-39.  It was probably built by Smith in 1860, at the time of his daughter Lizzie's death, and is one of Maine's most sophisticated expressions of Egyptian Revival architecture.  It was added to the National Register of Historic Places in 1974.

Description
The Smith tomb is located near Pond and Ash Avenues in the western portion of Evergreen Cemetery, a rural cemetery in Portland's western Deering neighborhood.  The tomb is a granite structure, most of which is covered by a mound of earth, leaving only the front facade.  It is in the form of an Egyptian pylon, mostly fashioned out of roughly finished granite blocks, topped by a projecting rolled cornice.  Dressed stone caps the sloping sides of the facade, and forms the pylon-shaped entrance to the tomb.  A sun disk motif is set above the cornice that tops the doorway, above which a panel is set with "F.O.J.S." in raised relief.  The door to the tomb is marble, and bears the following inscription:
NATURE
teaches that
All Flesh Must Die.
RELIGION
inspires Hope that all
Spiritual Beings will
live forever, in spheres
and forms to which they
are fitted.
Believe in
GOD,
and fear not to leave wholly
to Him the Great Future.
His plans for Heaven
as for Earth must be
All-wise, Benevolent
and
Immutable.
All men can know of future life.

History
Francis Ormand Jonathan Smith was one of Maine's more colorful political personalities of the mid-19th century.  He controversially opposed a state lottery to fund the Cumberland and Oxford Canal, and was politically peripatetic, supporting Whigs, Democrats, and Republicans in both his political and journalistic activities.  He was an early advocate of the telegraph, supporting the work of Samuel F.B. Morse, and engaged in a number of high-profile failed business ventures.

His tomb was built on his Portland estate about 1860, around the time when his daughter Lizzie died.  In 1876, when his estate was subdivided after his death,  the tomb and its contents were moved to Evergreen Cemetery. The design is believed to be Smith's.

See also
National Register of Historic Places listings in Portland, Maine

References

Monuments and memorials in Portland, Maine
Monuments and memorials on the National Register of Historic Places in Maine
Tombs in the United States
Egyptian Revival architecture in the United States
National Register of Historic Places in Portland, Maine
Individually listed contributing properties to historic districts on the National Register in Maine